Ali Shaheed Muhammad (born August 11, 1970) is an American hip hop DJ, record producer, and rapper, best known as a member of A Tribe Called Quest. With Q-Tip and Phife Dawg (and sometimes Jarobi White), the group released five studio albums from 1990 to 1998 before disbanding; their final album was released in 2016. A native of Brooklyn, New York, Muhammad currently lives in Los Angeles.

Career 

Muhammad is a Muslim. Together with Jay Dee and Q-Tip, he formed the music-production collective the Ummah.

After A Tribe Called Quest disbanded, Muhammad formed the R&B supergroup Lucy Pearl with Dawn Robinson, formerly of En Vogue and Raphael Saadiq, formerly of Tony! Toni! Toné!, releasing one album in 2000. On October 12, 2004, he released his debut solo album, Shaheedullah and Stereotypes. He is currently the co-host of NPR's Microphone Check radio show.

In 2013, Muhammad worked with producer Adrian Younge on the Souls of Mischief album There Is Only Now, as the album's narrator. Since then Muhammad and Younge have collaborated to co-produce the soundtrack for both seasons of the Luke Cage TV series, and they have toured together since 2018 as the Midnight Hour, releasing an album by the same name.

In 2019, Muhammad contributed to Saadiq's fifth album, Jimmy Lee.

In 2020, Muhammad and Younge launched the Jazz Is Dead album series, collaborating with jazz musicians Roy Ayers, Marcos Valle, Doug Carn, Gary Bartz, João Donato, and the trio Azymuth.

Discography 

Studio albums
Shaheedullah and Stereotypes (2004)

with Lucy Pearl
Lucy Pearl (2000)

with Adrian Younge
Luke Cage (Original Soundtrack Album) (2016)
Luke Cage: Season Two (Original Score) (2018)
The Midnight Hour  (2018)
Jazz Is Dead 001 (2020)
Roy Ayers JID002 (2020)
Marcos Valle JID003 (2020)
Azymuth JID004 (2020)
Doug Carn JID005 (2020)
Gary Bartz JID006 (2021)
João Donato JID007 (2021)
Brian Jackson JID008 (2021)
Instrumentals JID009 (2021)
Remixes JID010 (2021)
Jazz is Dead 011 (2022)
Jean Carne JID012 (2022)
Katalyst JID013 (2022)
Henry Franklin JID014 (2022)
Garret Saracho JID015 (2022)

See also 
A Tribe Called Quest
Lucy Pearl
The Ummah
Native Tongues
Raphael Saadiq
Chalmers Alford
D'Angelo
Fu-Schnickens

References

External links 

Official website
 Official A Tribe Called Quest website

Living people
African-American DJs
African-American Muslims
American hip hop DJs
American hip hop record producers
A Tribe Called Quest members
Musicians from Brooklyn
People from Bedford–Stuyvesant, Brooklyn
1970 births
Converts to Islam
African-American male rappers
East Coast hip hop musicians
Rappers from Brooklyn
21st-century American rappers
Record producers from New York (state)
Lucy Pearl members